Mohammed Yaqoub may refer to:
 Mohammed Yacoub (ISN 01004) is a captive held in extrajudicial detention, first in Bagram, then Guantanamo -- see Afghan captives in Guantanamo
 Mohammed Yaqoub Akhounzada, captive held in extrajudicial detention in Bagram Theater Internment Facility
 Muhammad Hussein Yacoub (born 1956), Egyptian cleric
 Mohammed Yaqoub Abbas, a sport hero, see Ajman Club
 Mohammed Yacoub Al Madadi, a former Quatari diplomat, fired after triggering a security alert aboard United Airlines Flight 663